Ectyonopsis ramosa is a species of  poriferan of the genus Ectyonopsis. E. ramosa was described by Herbert James Carter in 1883.

References

Demospongiae
Animals described in 1983